In the jargon of computer programming, a source upgrade is a modification of a computer program's source code, which adds new features and options to it, improves performance and stability, or fixes bugs and errors from the previous version. There are two popular types of source upgrades, which are listed here:

 Patch: source upgrade, where the modification of original source is provided in a special patch program. The patch is released by the developer of software. Generally, this type of source upgrade focus on bug and error fixing, not on adding new features to the engine. Patches are available on sites or FTP's of application developer. They can be also obtained from various computer magazines.
 Source port, which is a user modification (mod). The source port modification focuses on changes in original source code (mostly adding new features – like 3D renderers support, new graphic technologies usage or porting the game into other platform, which the original was not available for), without editing the other resources of software. Most of source ports are created for old, classic games — for example: Doom, Quake I/II, Strife, Duke Nukem 3D, Rise of the Triad. The source code of those applications can be easily and legally downloaded from the Internet under GPL license – they were released by the developers. Of course, those are custom applications and are not supported by the producers of software in any way.

See also
 Backward compatibility
 Doom source ports
 Source-code compatibility
 Source port
 ZDoom

External links
 Patches, Upgrades, Updates & Drivers
 Icculus Homepage – creator of multi-platform source ports
 WolfGL & NewWolf Homepage
 DarkPlaces Homepage
 Doomworld – Doom Source Ports section

Source code